Fever Pitch (released as The Perfect Catch outside the United States and Canada) is a 2005 American romantic comedy-drama film directed by the Farrelly brothers. It stars Drew Barrymore and Jimmy Fallon, and is a remake of the British 1997 film of the same title. Nick Hornby, who had written the original 1992 book and the 1997 screenplay adaptation, acted as an executive producer for the American remake.

While both the book and the original 1997 film are about soccer, the 2005 adaptation, aimed specifically at the U.S. market, is about baseball. Both Fever Pitch films feature real-life dramatic sporting victories, the original focusing on Arsenal's last minute League title win in the final game of the 1988–1989 season, and the remake on the Boston Red Sox's long-awaited World Series Championship in 2004, unanticipated while the film was in production.

The film was released on April 8, 2005. It received mixed reviews from critics and grossed $50 million.

Plot

7-year-old Ben Wrightman has just moved to Boston with his mother after his parents' divorce. His uncle Carl takes him to a Boston Red Sox game at Fenway Park to cheer him up. From that day on, he is a die-hard Red Sox fan for life.

23 years later, the adult Ben is still in Boston, working as a school teacher, and has inherited his uncle's season tickets. Almost all of his possessions bear the Red Sox logo (except for his toilet paper, which is of the New York Yankees). On a school trip, Ben meets Lindsey Meeks, a successful, dedicated corporate executive, and they begin dating.

Lindsey, who knows little about baseball or the Red Sox, learns about the Curse of the Bambino from Ben's stadium friends (including Al Waterman, a sponge salesman who also narrates the story). They continue attending the games together, but tension arises when Lindsey is up for a promotion and begins working on her laptop during the game. Lindsey is knocked out by a line drive foul and recovers but stops going to the games, suggesting Ben will have more fun if he goes with his friends.

Things get worse when Lindsey invites Ben to accompany her to Paris, and he declines because the Red Sox are in the heat of the pennant race. Before leaving, she tells Ben she might be pregnant. She expresses concern that he is more committed to the Red Sox than to her, and days later calls him and confirms she isn't pregnant. To prove he is not obsessed, he misses a game against the Yankees to escort Lindsey to her friend's birthday party. Ben and Lindsey enjoy the party, and after making love, he tells her it was one of the best nights of his life. Moments later, he gets an ecstatic call from his friend Troy, who tells him the Sox overcame a seven-run deficit in the bottom of the ninth to pull off one of the greatest comebacks in team history. Ben becomes irate that he missed such a historic Red Sox moment, blaming Lindsey for making him miss the game. She is heartbroken, and they separate.

Ben soon misses Lindsey and visits her in a futile attempt to reconcile. To prove she means more to him than the Red Sox, he plans to sell his season tickets. Lindsey finds out during the celebration for her much-anticipated promotion and rushes to stop him. She gets in during the 9th inning of the Red Sox–Yankees playoff game when the Red Sox are just three outs away from being swept, and Ben is in the stands about to finalize the ticket sale. Desperate to reach Ben, Lindsey runs across the field and running around players to avoid security. She tears up the contract and tells Ben that if he loves her enough to sell his seats, then she loves him enough not to let him to do it. They reunite and kiss in front of the entire crowd before Lindsey is arrested.

Al narrates the epilogue: the Red Sox won that game and then beat the Yankees three more times to win the American League pennant, later sweeping the National League champion St. Louis Cardinals for their first World Series title in 86 years. Lindsay and Ben travel to Busch Stadium in St. Louis for the decisive Game 4. Eventually they marry, and Lindsey conceives a 'player to be named later'. Al explains that the baby will be named Ted Williams Wrightman if it's a boy, "Carla Yastrzemski" Wrightman if it's a girl, adding, "Let's all hope for a boy." A post-credit scene shows a bunch of kids (presumably Ben & Lindsey's and their friends') chanting "LET'S GO, RED SOX!".

Cast

 Jimmy Fallon as Ben Wrightman
 Drew Barrymore as Lindsey Meeks
 James Sikking as Doug Meeks
 JoBeth Williams as Maureen Meeks
 Jason Spevack as Ben in 1980
 Jack Kehler as Al Waterman (also the narrator)
 Lenny Clarke as Uncle Carl
 Ione Skye as Molly
 Siobhan Fallon Hogan as Lana
 KaDee Strickland as Robin
 Marissa Jaret Winokur as Sarah
 Evan Helmuth as Troy
 Zen Gesner as Steve
 Jackie Burroughs as Mrs. Warren
 Stephen King as himself
 Kris Williams as herself
 Steve Levy as himself
 Willie Garson as Kevin
 Armando Riesco as Gerard
 Brett Murphy as Ryan
 Andrew Wilson as Grant Wade / Patrick Lyons

Several Boston Red Sox personnel make appearances in the film, including: players Johnny Damon, Trot Nixon, Jason Varitek and Jim Rice, and announcers Joe Castiglione, Don Orsillo and Dennis Eckersley.

Production
The original plot had assumed the Red Sox would lose in the playoffs. However, the Red Sox stunned the baseball world when they won four straight games to win the 2004 ALCS against the rival Yankees (becoming the first MLB team to win a seven-game series after losing the first three games) and subsequent World Series against the St. Louis Cardinals to break the "Curse of the Bambino". Thus, the ending had to be rewritten. On the day of Game 4, with the Red Sox on the verge of a sweep, The Farrellys decided to bring Barrymore, Fallon, and a film crew to St. Louis hours before the first pitch – and Barrymore and Fallon attended the game at Busch Stadium in character. When the Red Sox made the final out to secure a 3–0 win over the Cardinals that broke the Curse, Fox cameras on the live broadcast caught Barrymore and Fallon, as Lindsey and Ben, running onto the field and kissing to celebrate. The film, with its updated ending, was also screened at Fenway Park the following August on a screen in center field.

Originally, Shawn Levy, who was a huge fan of Nick Hornby's works for years, was attached to direct, with Gwyneth Paltrow playing Lindsey. However, Paltrow found the script mediocre and turned down the role. Brian Robbins replaced Levy, but he quit the project as well. After Drew Barrymore replaced Paltrow and Jimmy Fallon joined the cast, Jay Russell, P. J. Hogan, Luke Greenfield, and Mira Nair were all rumored candidates to direct until the studios hired the Farrelly brothers to take the helm for the film.

Reception

Critical response
On Rotten Tomatoes the film holds an approval rating 65% based on 196 reviews, with an average rating of 6.3/10. The site's critical consensus read, "While not a home run, Fever Pitch has enough charm and on-screen chemistry between the two leads to make it a solid hit." On Metacritic the film has a weighted average score of 56 out of 100, based on reviews from 37 critics, indicating "mixed or average reviews". Audiences surveyed by CinemaScore gave the film an average grade of "A−" on an A+ to F scale.

From a cinematographic and literary perspective, the film received some favorable criticism from experts Roger Ebert and James Berardinelli.

Box office 
The film opened at #3 and grossed $12.4 million in its opening weekend. The final North American gross of the film was $42.1 million, and the worldwide gross was $50.5 million.

Soundtrack

The Standells – "Dirty Water"
Dropkick Murphys – "Tessie"
Tears for Fears – "Who Killed Tangerine?"
 Popium – "Sooner or Later"
Ivy – "Thinking About You"
Nick Drake – "Northern Sky"
Marah – "My Heart Is the Bums on the Street"
Steve Wynn – "Second Best"
The J. Geils Band – "Whammer Jammer" (Live Version)
The Human League – "(Keep Feeling) Fascination"
Chic –  "Dance, Dance, Dance (Yowsah, Yowsah, Yowsah)"
Joe Pernice – "Moonshot Manny"
Jonathan Richman – "As We Walk to Fenway Park in Boston Town"
 Mad Larry  – "Window Pane"
Hurricane Smith – "Oh, Babe, What Would You Say?"

References

External links

 
 
 
 
 
 

2005 films
2005 romantic comedy films
2000s sports comedy films
American romantic comedy films
American sports comedy films
American baseball films
Remakes of American films
Films about educators
Films about fandom
Films produced by Drew Barrymore
Films set in Boston
Films shot in Boston
Films shot in Massachusetts
Films shot in St. Louis
Films shot in Toronto
Films based on British novels
20th Century Fox films
Flower Films films
Boston Red Sox
Films with screenplays by Lowell Ganz
Films with screenplays by Babaloo Mandel
Films based on works by Nick Hornby
Films directed by the Farrelly brothers
Films scored by Craig Armstrong (composer)
Films set in 1980
Films set in 2003
Films set in 2004
2000s English-language films
2000s American films
Films about Major League Baseball